Greg Tanner is a television producer and presenter from London, England. He is most known for fronting basketball programmes and is the editor of FadeAway magazine (now known as MVP Magazine).

Career

Producing and directing

In 2007, Tanner produced and presented UKTV Slam, 15 one-hour magazine programmes for Britain's second biggest non-terrestrial broadcaster. The series culminated in a four-hour live broadcast of the Euroleague finals, with Tanner reporting from Athens.

In 2008, Tanner presented and helped to produce (for Cheerleader Productions) two basketball documentaries for Channel 4. The first, Midnight Madness, was a 90-minute feature about a Nike-sponsored, nationwide summer basketball event. It involved shooting across the UK and in Miami, Florida.

In November 2008, Tanner presented "Team GB: Road To Eurobasket" - a 60-minute documentary following the Great Britain basketball team as they tried to qualify for the Eurobasket tournament for the first time.

In May 2010, Tanner presented features for Sky Sports' coverage of the Euroleague Final Four in Paris.

Away from his basketball activities, Tanner has worked as a television news producer and reporter. He began his career at London Tonight and worked with ITN as a producer on the ITV News Channel. Since 2004 he has worked on a freelance basis.

Basketball247.co.uk

In May 2000, Tanner set up the website Streetball.co.uk which became Basketball247.co.uk in 2008 - broadening its remit from just covering streetball to more mainstream basketball. He has traveled the world covering events - from the Euroleague to the NBA to Streetball.

References

External links
Greg Tanner personal website
MVP Magazine website

Year of birth missing (living people)
Living people
English television producers
English television presenters